Anniversary Day may refer to:

 Anniversary Day, one of the historical forerunners to Australia Day
 Anniversary Day, a public holiday in Tristan da Cunha
 Brooklyn–Queens Day, formerly Anniversary Day
 Provincial Anniversary Day in each province of New Zealand

See also

Anniversary (disambiguation)
Anniversary Days Observance Act 1859, an Act of the Parliament of the United Kingdom
Wedding anniversary